Lilian Bond (January 18, 1908 – January 25, 1991) was an English-American actress based in the United States.

Life and career
Bond was born in London and made her first professional stage appearance at the age of 14 in the pantomime Dick Whittington and His Cat. Later she joined the chorus of Piccadilly Revels and continued on the stage when she relocated to the United States, where her performances included roles in The Earl Carroll Vanities and in various productions of the Ziegfeld Follies.

Bond began working in films in 1929, initially in the drama No More Children for Cliff Broughton Productions. Between 1929 and 1931, she co-starred in eight additional films, most notably with Tom Tyler in the 1931 Western Rider of the Plains. In 1932, she was named a WAMPAS Baby Star, along with Gloria Stuart, Ginger Rogers, and other young actresses rising in popularity with theater audiences.

From 1932 to 1953, she had roles in 39 more films, ranging from lead characters to uncredited performances. In James Whale's comedic thriller starring Boris Karloff titled The Old Dark House (1932), Bond plays Gladys DuCane, a chorus girl who falls in love with Roger Penderel (played by Melvyn Douglas). Perhaps her best-known film role is in the 1940 Western The Westerner starring Gary Cooper and Walter Brennan. In that production she portrays the British-American actress and socialite Lillie Langtry. By the 1950s, her career had declined, with her having mostly TV appearances. She retired from acting at the age of 50 in 1958.

Personal life and death
Bond technically married four times, including marrying the same man twice. At the height of her career, on June 28, 1935, she wed Sidney Smith, a highly successful New York broker and celebrated big-game hunter; however, "a technical legal question" required the couple to remarry on September 3, 1936. In 1943 they separated, with each accusing the other of cruelty. Their divorce was finalized the next year.

In 1950, Bond married Morton Lowry; the union lasted six years. Finally, in 1961, she wed Michael Fessier, who was a screenwriter, film producer, and novelist. The two remained together until his death in 1988. Three years later, at age 83, Bond suffered a heart attack and died at a convalescent hospital in Reseda, California.

Selected filmography

 Sagebrush Politics (1930) as Cleo
 Stepping Out (1931)
 Manhattan Parade (1931) as Sewing girl
 The Squaw Man (1931) as Babs
 Rider of the Plains (1931) as Betty
 Hot Saturday (1932) as Eva Randolph
 Beauty and the Boss (1932) as Girl at the bar
 Man About Town (1932) as Carlotta Cortez
 The Old Dark House (1932) as Gladys
 Fireman, Save My Child (1932) as June Farnum
 High Pressure (1932)
 It's Tough to Be Famous (1932) as Edna Jackson
 Union Depot (1932) as Actress on train (uncredited)
 Air Mail (1932) as Irene Walkins
 The Trial of Vivienne Ware (1932) as Dolores Divine
 When Strangers Marry (1933) as Marion Drake
 Double Harness (1933) as Monica Page
 Take a Chance (1933) as Thelma Green
 Hot Pepper (1933) as Hortense
 Her Splendid Folly (1933) as Jill McAllister
 Pick-Up (1933) as Muriel Stevens
 The Big Brain (1933) as Dorothy Norton
 Hell Bent for Love (1934) as Millie Garland
 Dirty Work (1934)
 Affairs of a Gentleman (1934) as Carlotta Barbe
 The Bishop Misbehaves (1935) as Mrs. Millie Walker
 China Seas (1935) - Mrs. Timmons
 Blond Cheat (1938) as Roberta Trent
 Sued for Libel (1939) as Muriel Webster
 The Women (1939) as Mrs. Erskine
 The Housekeeper's Daughter (1939) as Gladys Fontaine
 The Westerner (1940) as Lillie Langtry
 Scotland Yard (1941) as Lady Constance
 A Desperate Chance for Ellory Queen (1942) as Adele Beldon
 A Tragedy at Midnight (1942) as Lola
 The Picture of Dorian Gray (1945) as Kate
 Nocturne (1946) as Mrs. Billings
 The Jolson Story (1947)
 Fighter Squadron (1948) as English lady
 That Forsythe Woman (1949) as Maid
 Shadow on the Wall (1950) as Attendant
 The Sniper (1952) as Mrs. Fitzpatrick
 The Big Trees (1952) as Daisy's girl
 Man in the Attic (1953) as Annie Rowley
 The Maze (1953) as Margaret Dilling
 Pirates of Tripoli (1955) as Sono

References

External links
 
 
 
 
 
 Lilian Bond at Virtual History Film

1908 births
1991 deaths
Actresses from London
British film actresses
British expatriate actresses in the United States
Burials at Hollywood Forever Cemetery
20th-century English actresses
WAMPAS Baby Stars